Allocasuarina nana, commonly known as the dwarf she-oak, is a small, usually dioecious plant found in eastern Australia. Often seen around one metre tall, it grows in exposed heathlands, ridges, clifftops on sandstone based soils. It is found on the coast and tablelands, south of the Cudgegong River near Mudgee.

The fruiting cones have a mostly smooth and tessellated surface, around 20 mm long and 12 mm wide. Branchlets are very short, less than 8 cm long, the habit is a multi-stemmed spreading low shrub, forming in dense colonies. The specific epithet nana is from Latin, referring to the dwarf size of this small plant.

References

External links
  Occurrence data for Allocasuarina nana from The Australasian Virtual Herbarium

nana
Flora of New South Wales
Flora of Victoria (Australia)
Fagales of Australia
Dioecious plants